The Uzbekistan Footballer of the Year is a yearly football award presented by the Uzbekistan Football Association to the most outstanding Uzbekistan footballer among who has been considered to have performed the best in national team or over Uzbekistan Super League and other national championship season. The award is given out at the end of the calendar year and is decided by the survey among sport journalists and football experts.

Player of the Year award winners

By player

By club

See also
 Uzbekistan Football Coach of the Year

References

External links
 Uzbekistan - Footballer and Coach of the Year

Lists of footballers in Uzbekistan
Uzbekistani football trophies and awards
Awards established in 1992
1992 establishments in Uzbekistan
Annual events in Uzbekistan
Association football player non-biographical articles